Main Street is a 2010 American drama film about several residents of Durham, North Carolina, a city in the Southern U.S., whose lives are changed by the arrival of a stranger with a controversial plan to save their decaying hometown.

Plot
Each of the colorful citizens of a close-knit North Carolina community—from a once-wealthy tobacco heiress to the city's mayor to a local police officer—will search for ways to reinvent themselves, their relationships and the very heart of their neighborhood.

Cast
 Colin Firth as Gus Leroy
 Ellen Burstyn as Georgiana Carr
 Patricia Clarkson as Willa Jenkins
 Orlando Bloom as Harris Parker
 Amber Tamblyn as Mary Saunders
 Margo Martindale as Myrtle Parker
 Andrew McCarthy as Howard Mercer
 Victoria Clark as Miriam
 Isiah Whitlock Jr. as Mayor
 Tom Wopat as Frank
 Viktor Hernandez as Estaquio
 Juan Piedrahita as Jose (as Juan Carlos Piedrahita)
 Thomas Upchurch as Trooper Williams
 Dennis Regling as Robert Dunning
 Reid Dalton as Crosby Gage
 Amy da Luz as Rita

Production

The film was shot nearly entirely in Durham, North Carolina in April and May 2009.  The screenplay was written by Pulitzer Prize–winning writer Horton Foote after he found downtown Durham empty on a weekend visit several years earlier.

Myriad Pictures bought the international distribution rights in May 2009.  The film was promoted at the 2009 Cannes Film Festival by its producers and stars.

Reception
Reception for the film has been generally negative. On review aggregation website Rotten Tomatoes, the film has a 14% approval rating based on reviews from seven critics, with an average score of 4.7/10.

Blog Critics reviewed the film, saying, "Everything that occurs in the film feels shallow somehow, and it’s a shame because Main Street had all of the basic elements that would have made it truly, a great film."

References

External links
 
 
 

American independent films
Films shot in North Carolina
Films set in North Carolina
2010 drama films
2010 films
American drama films
Films scored by Patrick Doyle
Films produced by Megan Ellison
2010s English-language films
2010s American films